Sergey Alexeyevich Lebedev (2 November 1902, n.s. – 3 July 1974) was a Soviet scientist in the fields of electrical engineering and computer science, and designer of the first Soviet computers.

Biography

Lebedev was born in Nizhny Novgorod, Russian Empire. He graduated from Moscow Highest Technical School in 1928. From then until 1946 he worked at All-Union Electrotechnical Institute (formerly a division of MSTU) in Moscow and Kyiv. In 1939 he was awarded the degree of Doctor of Sciences for the development of the theory of "artificial stability" of electrical systems.

During World War II, Lebedev worked in the field of control automation of complex systems. His group designed a weapon-aiming stabilization system for tanks and an automatic guidance system for airborne missiles. To perform these tasks Lebedev developed an analog computer system to solve ordinary differential equations.

From 1946 to 1951 he headed the Kiev Electrotechnical Institute of the Ukrainian Academy of Sciences, working on improving the stability of electrical systems. For this work he received the Stalin (State) prize in 1950.

In 1948 Lebedev learned from foreign magazines that scientists in western countries were working on the design of electronic computers, although the details were secret. In the autumn of the same year he decided to focus the work of his laboratory on computer design. Lebedev's first computer, MESM, was fully completed by the end of 1951.  In April 1953 the State commission accepted the BESM-1 as operational, but it did not go into series production because of opposition from the Ministry of Machine and Instrument Building, which had developed its own weaker and less reliable machine.

Lebedev then began development of a new, more powerful computer, the M-20, the number denoting its expected processing speed of twenty thousand operations per second. In 1958 the machine was accepted as operational and put into series production. Simultaneously the BESM-2, a development of the BESM-1, went into series production. Though the BESM-2 was slower than the M-20, it was more reliable. It was used to calculate satellite orbits and the trajectory of the first rocket to reach the surface of the Moon. Lebedev and his team developed several more computers, notably the BESM-6, which was in production for 17 years.

In 1952, Lebedev became a professor at the Moscow Institute of Physics and Technology. From 1953 until his death he was the director of what is now called the Institute of Precision Mechanics and Computer Engineering.

Lebedev died in Moscow and is interred at Novodevichy Cemetery.

In 1996 the IEEE Computer Society recognized Sergey Lebedev with a Computer Pioneer Award for his work in the field of computer design and his founding of the Soviet computer industry.

See also

History of computing hardware
List of pioneers in computer science

References

Burials at Novodevichy Cemetery
Computer designers
Bauman Moscow State Technical University alumni
Academic staff of the Moscow Institute of Physics and Technology
Heroes of Socialist Labour
Soviet computer scientists
Full Members of the USSR Academy of Sciences
Russian expatriates in Ukraine
1902 births
1974 deaths
Soviet inventors